Sam Egan is a journalist, and a screenwriter and producer for television.

Career
His credits include writing and producing for such shows as Quincy, M.E., The Incredible Hulk, The Fall Guy, Northern Exposure, The Outer Limits, Sanctuary and Jeremiah. He is the son of a Holocaust survivor and based The Outer Limits episode "Tribunal" on his father's experience in the Auschwitz-Birkenau concentration camp where his father's first wife and daughter were killed by the Nazis.

As a journalist, Egan has written for Rolling Stone magazine and was editor of the arts magazine The Every Other Weekly. Egan has most recently worked for Shaw's Canadian Sci-Fi Series "Continuum" and "Beloved Mr. Fox," along with Alexander McCall Smith, as a creative consultant. He is also the developer for Television of Robert Rotenburg's "Old City Hall" for CTV. Before working here, he was the creative consultant on the Canadian mini-series "Bloodletting and Other Mirculous Cures". Currently, he is working on the development of two Internet series, "The Node" for Trifecta productions and "State of Syn" for Shaftesbury Films as well as writing for the Netflix / City series Between.

Prior, he worked for CTV and FOX International as Executive Producer of season two of the Listener. He was previously Co-Executive Producer of ABC's "V".

Awards and honors
His work on "Sanctuary" received a nomination for a Leo Award in Canada. The episode he wrote called "Out of Ashes" for the show "Jeremiah" won him the Literacy in the Media Award for Outstanding Television Series. Also, the episode of "Jeremiah" called "City of Roses" was nominated for Canada's Top Ten Writing Awards- Egan's second nomination.

Personal
Sam Egan is married to Jane and has two daughters and three grandchildren.  Egan is renowned for his extensive collection of art deco lamps and light fixtures. When his parents moved to the United States from Europe, they changed their last name to Egan to sound more American. They chose the last name of their favorite actor, Richard Egan.

Screenwriting credits

Television
 The Incredible Hulk (1979)
 Quincy, M.E. (1979-1983)
 Manimal (1983)
 Automan (1983-1984)
 Cover Up (1984)
 The Fall Guy (1984-1986)
 Snoops (1989-1990)
 Tropical Heat (1991-1993)
 Northern Exposure (1994-1995)
 Diagnosis: Murder (1996)
 Second Noah (1996-1997)
 The Outer Limits  (1997-2001)
 Stargate SG-1 (1998, 2003)
 Jeremiah (2002)
 Masters of Science Fiction (2007)
 Sanctuary (2008-2009)
 Knights of Bloodsteel (2009)
 V (2009)
 The Listener (2011-2014)
 Continuum (2012-2014)
 Between (2016)

Films
 Imagine: John Lennon (1988)
 Elvira: Mistress of the Dark (1988)

References

External links

Sam Egan's bio at The Outer Limits site

Date of birth missing (living people)
American male journalists
American television writers
American male television writers
American television producers
Jewish American journalists
American screenwriters
Living people
Year of birth missing (living people)
21st-century American Jews